"Mirai (Ashita)" is the second Japanese single released by BTOB. It was released in four versions: a limited CD+DVD edition that came with a photo booklet and three regular CD only editions, each with a different B-side.

Commercial performance 
The single debuted and peaked at number 2 on the Oricon Singles Chart for the week ending March 29, 2015. In its second week, the single fell to number 34 before dropping from the Top 50. The single was the 80th best-selling single in 2015.

Track list

Charts

Weekly charts

Year-end charts

Chart sales

References

2015 singles
Japanese-language songs
2015 songs
BtoB songs